Project Infinity is a Big Finish Productions audio drama based on the long-running British science fiction television series Doctor Who.

Plot 
The Daleks are retreating as the rebellion seems to be succeeding.

Cast
Kalendorf – Gareth Thomas
Mirana – Teresa Gallagher
Alby Brook – Mark McDonnell
The Seer – Joyce Gibbs
Dr Johnstone – Simon Bridge
Espeelius – Ian Brooker
Herrick – Jeremy James
Tanlee – David Sax
Dalek Voices – Nicholas BriggsAlistair Lock, Steven Allen and Robert Lock

External links
Big Finish Productions – Project Infinity

Project Infinity
Audio plays by Nicholas Briggs